Suffield is a village and a civil parish in the English county of Norfolk. The village lies east of the A140 between Cromer and Norwich. The nearest railway station is at Gunton for the Bittern Line which runs between Sheringham, Cromer and Norwich. The nearest airport is Norwich International Airport.

Its parish church is St Margaret's.

References

External links

 Beautiful Cooks Farm Barns Holiday Let Development in Suffield Common, Norfolk

North Norfolk
Villages in Norfolk
Civil parishes in Norfolk